State Route 39 (SR 39) is a primarily east–west running state highway in north-central and northeastern portion of the U.S. state of Ohio. The route runs through seven counties on its approximately  trip through the region. Its western terminus is at State Route 103 near New Washington, and its eastern terminus is at PA 68 near East Liverpool.

Route Description

Columbiana County
Ohio State Route 39 has an eastern terminus at the Pennsylvania state line near East Liverpool, Ohio. It then continues as a two-laned road through residential areas of East Liverpool. It widens into a four lane road just east of the interchange with US 30, and proceeds northwest as a freeway around downtown East Liverpool.

History
SR 39 was commissioned in 1923, originally routed from Shelby to Dover. In 1927 the highway was extended to the current eastern terminus at the Pennsylvania state line, along mostly the former route of SR 20. The route was extended to its current northern terminus at SR 103, in 1939. Between 1969 and 1971 the road between Shelby and Mansfield became a four-lane highway. In 1974, the route between Wellsville and East Liverpool was upgraded to a four-lane highway.

Junctions

References

External links

039
Transportation in Crawford County, Ohio
Transportation in Richland County, Ohio
Transportation in Ashland County, Ohio
Transportation in Holmes County, Ohio
Transportation in Tuscarawas County, Ohio
Transportation in Carroll County, Ohio
Transportation in Columbiana County, Ohio